Stage, also known as Manoto Stage, is an Iranian television reality music competition, based on the original British series, and an addition to The X Factor franchise, to find new singing talent. The show began airing from London on 7 January 2016 and was broadcast by Manoto. 

The judging panel consisted of Shahram Azar (Sandi), Hamed Nikpay, Babak Saeedi and Reza Rohani. The show was hosted by Raha Etemadi in 2 seasons. In addition, Stage has brought in several famous musical guest stars to perform live on the show, including Aref, Afshin, Sepideh, Ava Bahram and Shahab Tiam.

The winners were chosen by people's votes in Manoto application and receive a $50.000 prize. The winners of season 1 and 2 were respectively Amirhossein Eftekhari from Hamed Nikpay's group and Alireza Saremi from Reza Rouhani's group.

Stage Xtra 
Stage Xtra was aired every Friday during the second season with salome seyednia as the host. It showed behind the scenes, absent voices, and events of the stage show.

See also 
 Googoosh Music Academy
 The Voice Persia
 Persia's Got Talent

References 

Iran
Television shows filmed in England
Persian-language television shows